Fulton "Flip" Frederick Johnson (born July 13, 1963 in Cheek, Texas) is a retired American football player who played in the National Football League.

Career
Flip Johnson played in 27 National Football League games in 1988 and 1989 for the Buffalo Bills as a wide receiver and returner.

Profile
Height: 5 ft 10 in
Weight: 185 lb.
Birthday: July 13, 1963
Hometown: Cheek, TX
College: McNeese State University

Career stats
NFL
Catches - 34
Yards - 473
Touchdowns - 2
Yards Per Catch-13.9

American football wide receivers
1963 births
Living people
People from Jefferson County, Texas
Buffalo Bills players
Players of American football from Texas
McNeese Cowboys football players